Lešnica is a village in the municipality of Kičevo, North Macedonia. It used to be part of the former Zajas Municipality.

Demographics
As of the 2021 census, Lešnica had 95 residents with the following ethnic composition:
Albanians 70
Macedonians 20
Persons for whom data are taken from administrative sources 5

According to the 2002 census, the village had a total of 219 inhabitants. Ethnic groups in the village include:
Albanians 182
Macedonians 37

References

External links

Villages in Kičevo Municipality
Albanian communities in North Macedonia